Hampton Del Ruth (September 7, 1879 – May 15, 1958) was an American film actor, director, screenwriter, and film producer.  Among other work, he wrote the intertitles for the final American studio-made silent film Legong: Dance of the Virgins (1935).

Del Ruth began working in film in 1913 and continued until the early 1930s.  He also wrote at least two novels: Port o' Heart's Desire (1926) and Without Restraint (1936).  He was the older brother of film director Roy Del Ruth and uncle of Cinematographer Thomas Del Ruth.

Selected filmography

External links

 
 

American film directors
American male film actors
American film producers
American male screenwriters
American male silent film actors
Burials at Forest Lawn Memorial Park (Glendale)
1879 births
1958 deaths
Silent film directors
Silent film screenwriters
Male actors from Delaware
20th-century American male actors
20th-century American male writers
20th-century American screenwriters